General Evans may refer to:

Clement A. Evans (1833–1911), Confederate States Army brigadier general
Frank Evans (general) (1876–1941), U.S. Marine Corps brigadier general
Frederic Dahl Evans (1866–1953), U.S. Army brigadier general
Geoffrey Charles Evans (1901–1987), British Army lieutenant general
Harry L. Evans (1919–2008), U.S. Air Force major general
Horace Moule Evans (1841–1923), British Indian Army general
Jason T. Evans (fl. 1980s–2020s), U.S. Army lieutenant general 
Lewis Pugh Evans (1881–1962), British Army brigadier general
Mark Evans (general) (born 1953), Australian Army lieutenant general
Nathan George Evans (1824–1868), Confederate States Army brigadier general
Robert K. Evans (1852–1926), U.S. Army brigadier general
Roger Evans (British Army officer) (1886–1968), British Army major general
Thomas Evans (British Army officer) (1776–1863), British Army lieutenant general
Tim Evans (British Army officer) (born 1962), British Army lieutenant general
Vernon Evans (general) (1893–1987), U.S. Army major general
William Evans (British Army officer) (fl. 1710s–1740s), British Army lieutenant general
William Andrew Evans (born 1939), British Army major general
William J. Evans (general) (1924–2000), U.S. Air Force general

See also
Attorney General Evans (disambiguation)